Anatoliy Ivanovych Polivoda (born 29 May 1947) is a retired Ukrainian basketball player who played for the Budivelnyk of Kiev and the Soviet Union. He trained at VSS Avanhard in Kiev.

He played in the Soviet team at the 1968 Olympic Games in which he won a bronze medal, and at the 1972 Olympic Games where he won a gold medal.

Titles:
 World Champion 1967
 European champion: 1967, 1969, 1971
 Soviet League champion 1967

References

1947 births
Living people
Basketball players from Kyiv
Ukrainian men's basketball players
Soviet men's basketball players
1967 FIBA World Championship players
Olympic basketball players of the Soviet Union
Basketball players at the 1972 Summer Olympics
Basketball players at the 1968 Summer Olympics
Olympic gold medalists for the Soviet Union
Olympic bronze medalists for the Soviet Union
FIBA EuroBasket-winning players
Olympic medalists in basketball
BC Budivelnyk players
Avanhard (sports society) sportspeople
Medalists at the 1972 Summer Olympics
Medalists at the 1968 Summer Olympics
FIBA World Championship-winning players
Power forwards (basketball)
National University of Ukraine on Physical Education and Sport alumni